Tiberiu Adrian Lung (born 24 December 1978) is a Romanian former professional footballer who played as a goalkeeper. After retirement he started his coaching career, as a goalkeeping coach.

International career
Tiberiu Lung played his only game for Romania on 3 March 1999 when coach Victor Pițurcă introduced him in the 89th minute to replace Bogdan Lobonț in a friendly which ended with a 2–0 victory against Estonia.

Personal life
He is the son of Silviu Lung and older brother of Silviu Lung Jr.

Honours
Steaua București
Divizia A: 2000–01
Supercupa României: 2001
Pandurii Târgu Jiu
Divizia B: 2004–05

References

External links
 
 

1978 births
Living people
Sportspeople from Craiova
Romanian footballers
Romania international footballers
Association football goalkeepers
Liga I players
Liga II players
Cypriot First Division players
Cypriot Second Division players
FC U Craiova 1948 players
FC Steaua București players
CS Pandurii Târgu Jiu players
Ayia Napa FC players
Onisilos Sotira players
Mpumalanga Black Aces F.C. players
Romanian expatriate footballers
Romanian expatriate sportspeople in Cyprus
Expatriate footballers in Cyprus
Romanian expatriate sportspeople in South Africa
Expatriate soccer players in South Africa